Jonas Brothers: The 3D Concert Experience is a 2009 American concert film released in Disney Digital 3D, RealD 3D and IMAX 3D. It was released in the United States and Canada on February 27, 2009 with the release in other countries later on. The film stars Kevin, Joe and Nick Jonas of the American pop band, the Jonas Brothers, in their theatrical debut.

Despite receiving generally negative reviews from critics, the film grossed $23.1 million worldwide.

Plot
The 3D Concert Experience follows the Jonas Brothers during their Burnin' Up Tour in a behind-the-scenes look at their busy schedule while in New York City, August 9–11, 2008. As part of their concert tour, they also go on a press tour, including interviews and television performances to promote the release of their third studio album, A Little Bit Longer and ending their day in Madison Square Garden. The film intercuts to concert performances off their self-titled second studio album and third studio album, filmed during their tour on July 13–14, 2008 in Anaheim. Performing alongside the Jonas Brothers are guest stars Demi Lovato on "This Is Me", Taylor Swift on "Should've Said No" and the brothers' bodyguard Robert "Big Rob" Feggans on "Burnin' Up". The film also debuted two new studio recordings, "Love Is On Its Way", which was filmed in Central Park, and "Live to Party", which would later serve as the theme song for their Disney Channel TV series.

Cast
Main
 Kevin Jonas - Guitar, backup vocals
 Joe Jonas - Vocals, guitar
 Nick Jonas - Guitar, vocals, drums, piano
 Demi Lovato - Vocals
 Taylor Swift - Vocals, guitar
 Robert "Big Rob" Feggans - Vocals

Band members
 John Taylor - Musical director/guitar
 Jack Lawless - Drums
 Ryan Liestman - Keyboards
 Greg Garbowsky - Bass

Additional
 Kevin Jonas, Sr.
 Denise Jonas
 Frankie Jonas

Set list
 "Lovebug" (instrumental) [intro]
 "Tonight" (studio recorded vocals/live band in background) [opening credits]
 "That's Just the Way We Roll"
 "Hold On"
 "BB Good"
 "Goodnight and Goodbye"
 "Video Girl"
 "Gotta Find You"
 "This Is Me" (with Demi Lovato)
 "A Little Bit Longer"
 "Play My Music" (studio recording)
 "Hello Beautiful"
 "Still in Love with You"
 "Pushin' Me Away"
 "Can't Have You"
 "Should've Said No" (with Taylor Swift)
 "Love Is On Its Way"
 "S.O.S."
 "Live to Party" (studio recording)
 "Burnin' Up" (with Robert "Big Rob" Feggans)
 "Tonight" (studio recording) [end credits]
 "Shelf" (live performance) [end credits]

Soundtrack

The film's soundtrack was released on February 24, 2009, three days before the film's release. It debuted at number #3 on the Billboard 200.

Reception and box office
The film received mostly negative reviews from critics; it holds a 24% "Rotten" rating on the review aggregator website Rotten Tomatoes based on 76 critics' reviews (15 fresh, 61 rotten). The consensus reads, "Jonas Brothers: The 3-D Concert Experience should please the brothers' adoring followers, but for non-converts, this concert film is largely flat and unenlightening." On Metacritic, the film has a score of 45 out of 100 based on 14 reviews. In general, critics panned the film for lacking appeal to any people outside the group's fan base. According to Box Office Mojo in 2009, it was the sixth highest-grossing concert film, following Justin Bieber: Never Say Never, Michael Jackson's This Is It, Hannah Montana and Miley Cyrus: Best of Both Worlds Concert (in which the Jonas Brothers had a guest star role), One Direction: This Is Us and Katy Perry: Part of Me.
 
The film was nominated for a Teen Choice Award in 2009 for "Choice Movie: Music/Dance" and "Choice Music Album: Soundtrack".

Home media
The film was released on DVD and Blu-ray on June 30, 2009. In the US, the Blu-ray edition of the film includes the anaglyph 3D version, with both one and two-disc DVD editions including only the 2D version of the film. However, for the UK and Australia DVD releases, Disney chose to release the film with the 3D version on DVD, as there was no Blu-ray release in either country.

Blu-ray Extended Edition
 3D version of the film
 Two performances not included in the theatrical release: "Can't Have You" and "A Little Bit Longer"
 Extra songs included as bonus features: "Shelf" and "Lovebug"
 Up Close and Personal: Behind the Scenes with the Jonas Brothers

The film was included as part of the release catalogue for the launch of the Disney+ streaming platform in November 2019, along with Hannah Montana and Miley Cyrus: Best of Both Worlds Concert. However, the film was not released in 3D and was renamed Jonas Brothers: The Concert Experience, much like the non-Blu-ray release of the concert film.

See also
 Jonas Brothers
 Burnin' Up Tour
 Demi Lovato
 Taylor Swift
 Camp Rock

References

External links
 
 
 
 
 
 

2009 films
2009 3D films
3D concert films
American 3D films
Films directed by Bruce Hendricks
Golden Raspberry Award winning films
Jonas Brothers concert tours
Walt Disney Pictures films
2000s English-language films